The Natural History Museum is a museum in Port Louis, Mauritius.

History
The museum is the oldest in Mauritius. The museum building was constructed in 1880. On 22 December 2021, Prime Minister Pravind Jugnauth inaugurated the Mauritian Ex-Servicemen's World War I and World War II Tribute Gallery inside the museum.

Architecture
The museum is located at the ground floor of Mauritius Institute building. It consists of Fauna Gallery, Marine Life Gallery, Insects, Meteorology, Giant Tortoise Gallery and The World of the Dodo.

Exhibitions
The museum exhibits various replica of fauna and flora.

See also
 List of museums in Mauritius

References

Buildings and structures completed in 1880
Buildings and structures in Port Louis
Museums in Mauritius